Centralia Municipal Airport  is a U.S. general aviation airport located two nautical miles southeast of Centralia, Illinois.

Facilities and Aircraft
The airport has two asphalt runways: runway 18/35 is 5001 x 75 ft (1524 x 23 m), while Runway 9/27 3300 x 60 ft (1006 x 18 m).

For the 12-month period ending August 31, 2019, the airport has 77 aircraft operations per day, or about 28,000 per year. That consists of 92% general aviation, 7% air taxi, and <1% military. For the same time period, there are 39 aircraft based on the field: 31 single-engine and 8 multi-engine.

Flight Training
The airport is home to the Airgo International Flight School, which provides part 141 flight training through the airline transport pilot license, FAR 135 charter operations, and has previously been an aircraft dealership and fixed-base operator. The school places focus on attracting international students on the premise that the school is cheaper and moves more quickly than its international counterparts.

Accidents & Incidents
On July 23, 2022, a Beechcraft Bonanza crashed into a pool near Centralia Municipal. One passenger was killed, and the pilot was taken to the hospital for treatment.

References

Airports in Illinois
Buildings and structures in Clinton County, Illinois